Canaan Lee Smith (born August 24, 1982) is an American country music singer and songwriter signed with Round Here Records, an independent label founded by Florida Georgia Line. He has released two albums, Bronco in 2015 and High Country Sound in 2021. His second single, "Love You Like That", was a Number One hit on the Billboard Country Airplay chart. He was also a reality television contestant on the 15th season of The Amazing Race.

Career

2009-2017: Mercury Nashville and Bronco
In 2009, Smith moved to Nashville, Tennessee, aspiring for a musical career and co-wrote the hit "Runaway" by country band Love and Theft that made it to number 10 in the Billboard Hot Country Songs and 65 on the Billboard Hot 100 in 2009.

His debut single, "We Got Us", was released in January 2012 after being made available on iTunes starting December 24, 2011. The song was written by Stephen Barker Liles, Tommy Lee James, and Canaan Smith himself and produced by Brett Beavers and Luke Wooten. It debuted at number 53 on the country music charts. The music video, directed by Brian Lazarro, was broadcast on GAC making it to the "GAC Top 20 Ballot". Country Weekly magazine featured him in "Ones to Watch in 2012", as did Roughstock.

Smith returned to the studio in February 2012 to finish his debut album. On July 21, 2014, Canaan Smith released his second single, titled "Love You Like That". The music video was released on Vevo on September 10, 2014.

In October 2014, Smith was featured as one of the "10 New Artists You Need To Know: Fall 2014" in Rolling Stone Country.

On March 24, 2015, Smith released his self-titled EP. The EP debuted at No. 16 on the Top Country Albums chart and at No. 97 on the Billboard 200, with 2,900 copies sold in the US for the week. On June 23, Smith released his first full-length studio album, titled Bronco. "Love You Like That" reached number one on the Country Airplay chart in July 2015, and number 46 on the Billboard Hot 100. The second single from the album, "Hole in a Bottle," was released in August. In September, Smith announced his first headlining concert tour, the Stompin' Grounds Tour, with support from Russell Dickerson.

In 2016, Smith appeared in the season four finale of Bar Rescue where he performed during the grand re-opening of The Gallopin' Goose.

2018-present: Round Here Records and Tree Vibez Music
In March 2018, Smith parted ways with his label Mercury Nashville. In May 2018, Smith then signed as a songwriter with publishing company Tree Vibez Music, founded by Tyler Hubbard and Brian Kelley of Florida Georgia Line.

In February 2019, it was announced Smith would join Florida Georgia Line on their Can’t Say I Ain’t Country Tour on select dates alongside Dan + Shay, Morgan Wallen, and HARDY. In August 2019, Smith signed with Round Here Records as their flagship artist, and released a new track titled “Beer Drinking Weather”. The label was founded the same day by Hubbard and Kelley who also co-wrote the new track.

In June 2020, Smith released his first single to country radio in three years, "Colder Than You". His second studio album, High Country Sound, was released on April 2, 2021.

Personal life
Smith graduated from Lafayette High School in Williamsburg, Virginia and then attended Belmont University in Nashville.

Smith and his then-girlfriend, Mika Combs, were the sixth team to be eliminated in the 15th season of The Amazing Race.

In March 2014, Smith became engaged to his girlfriend Christy Hardesty, and they married in August 2014. On September 27, 2019 they announced they are expecting their first child in November 2019. On October 31, 2019 they welcomed daughter Virginia Rose Smith.

Discography

Studio albums

Extended plays

Singles

Music videos

Tours

References

External links 
 

American male singer-songwriters
American country singer-songwriters
Living people
The Amazing Race (American TV series) contestants
Country musicians from Virginia
1982 births
Mercury Records artists
Belmont University alumni
American tenors
Singer-songwriters from Virginia
People from Williamsburg, Virginia
21st-century American singers